Ratan Raajputh, is an Indian television actress and blogger known for her portrayal of Laali in Agle Janam Mohe Bitiya Hi Kijo on Zee TV. Later, she went on to play Amba in Mahabharat & Santoshi in Santoshi Maa.

Early life
Ratan was born and brought up in Bihar and did her schooling from there.

Career
Ratan made television debut with Raavan in 2006. Raajputh rose to prominence with her portrayal of Laali in television series Agle Janam Mohe Bitiya Hi Kijo and earned numerous accoloads. In 2013, Ratan participated in a reality show Bigg Boss 7 and got evicted on day 28.

Ratan lost her father and was suffering from depression when she begin traveling to cope with it. Following the lockdown in 2020, Ratan started her YouTube channel where she shares her traveling story. Ratan lockdown videos made waves on internet and was covered by major news portal.

Television

Awards
2009 Zee Rishtey Awards 
 Favourite Saas-Bahu  – Agle Janam Mohe Bitiya Hi Kijo
 Popular Female Face of the Year – Agle Janam Mohe Bitiya Hi Kijo

2009 Indian Telly Awards
 Best Actress in a Lead Role – Agle Janam Mohe Bitiya Hi Kijo

2009 Indian Television Academy Awards
 Best Actress Drama – Agle Janam Mohe Bitiya Hi Kijo

2010 Gold Awards
 Best Actress in a Lead Role – Agle Janam Mohe Bitiya Hi Kijo

References

External links 

Indian television actresses
Living people
1987 births
Actresses from Patna
21st-century Indian actresses
Bigg Boss (Hindi TV series) contestants